Jan Sepp (1778-1853) was a Dutch entomologist.

He is noted for Surinaamsche vlinders : naar het leven geteekend ( Papillons de Surinam dessinés d'après nature), a three volume work containing approximately 150 entomological illustrations of lepidoptera together with their verbal descriptions, for which he contributed the texts.

His zoological author abbreviation is Sepp.  See also the list of taxa named by him.

Other publications
(1847) Natuurlijke historie van Surinaamsche vlinders : naar het leven geteekend / Histoire naturelle des papillons de Surinam
(1850) Natuurlijke historie van schadelijke insekten
(1800-) Flora Batava, afgebeeld door en van wegens J.C. Sepp en zoon with his father, Jan Christiaan Sepp.

Gallery

References

External links 

Dutch entomologists
1778 births
1853 deaths